The Sheko Forest brush-furred rat (Lophuromys pseudosikapusi) is a species of brush-furred mouse found in Ethiopia.

References

Lophuromys
Mammals described in 2007